Archives of Scientific Psychology is an open access academic journal published by the American Psychological Association. The journal publishes articles pertaining to the many different sub-fields of psychology, including neuroscience and political psychology. The journal includes articles that cover the many different research methodologies employed by psychologists. The editor-in-chief is Cecil R. Reynolds (Texas A&M University). It is abstracted and indexed in PsycINFO.

The journal's policy mandates data sharing, but its implementation of that practice has been criticized.

References

External links

American Psychological Association academic journals
English-language journals